The bluebelly Java snake or Fruhstorfer's mountain snake (Tetralepis fruhstorferi) is a species of snake in the superfamily Colubroidea. It is the only member of the genus Tetralepis. 

It is found in Java.

References 

Colubrids
Reptiles of Indonesia
Reptiles described in 1892